Houshayu Area is an area and a town located on the western side of Shunyi District, Beijing, China. It shares border with Gaoliying Town in the north, Nanfaxin Town and Capital Airport Subdistrict in the east, Konggang Subdistrict in the south, and Beiqijia Town in the west. It had a population of 74,841 as of 2020.

The town's name originated in the Yuan dynasty. At the time the settlement in this region was called Shayu for its concaved landscape and being covered in sands. It was split into two villages in the Ming dynasty, and Houshayu became the predecessor of the town today.

History

Administrative divisions 

As of 2021, Houshayu Area was composed of 16 subdivisions, in which 6 were communities and 10 were villages:

Gallery

See also 

 List of township-level divisions of Beijing

References 

Shunyi District
Towns in Beijing